Iohana Cruz Talabera (born January 9, 1980) is a female diver from Cuba. She represented her native country at two consecutive Summer Olympics, starting in 2000 (Sydney, Australia). Cruz won a bronze medal at the 2003 Pan American Games alongside Yolanda Ortiz in the Women's 10m Platform Synchro event.

References
 

1980 births
Living people
Cuban female divers
Olympic divers of Cuba
Divers at the 2000 Summer Olympics
Divers at the 2004 Summer Olympics
Pan American Games bronze medalists for Cuba
Pan American Games medalists in diving
Divers at the 2003 Pan American Games
Medalists at the 2003 Pan American Games